Hamburg Pavilion is a regional shopping center located along I-75 and Man o' War Boulevard in Lexington, Kentucky. The shopping center is anchored by Target, Big Lots, PetSmart, Meijer, Kohl's, Dick's Sporting Goods, Staples, Regal Cinemas, Half Price Books, Barnes & Noble, At Home, Bed Bath & Beyond, Total Wine & More, Value City Furniture, Gordon Food Service (GFS), Cost Plus World Market, Buy Buy Baby, and Best Buy. It is part of the Hamburg Place development.

Restaurants include Bonefish Grill, Johnny Carino's, Raffertys, Carrabbas Italian Grill, Outback Steakhouse, Old Chicago, Frisch's Big Boy, Red Lobster, and BD's Mongolian Grill. 

Hotels include TownePlace Suites, Hyatt Place, Courtyard by Marriott, Sleep Inn, Holiday Inn, Homewood Suites by Hilton, and Residence Inn by Marriott.

Hamburg Pavilion was developed on land that was once part of Hamburg Place Farm, for which its name is derived. The first stores opened in the shopping center in 1997.

References

External links

Hamburg Pavilion - Official Website
Thomas Enterprises, INC

Shopping malls in Kentucky
Commercial buildings in Lexington, Kentucky
Shopping malls established in 1997